The Turkey women's national field hockey team is organized by the Turkish Hockey Federation and represents Turkey in international women's field hockey competitions.

Turkey won the 2017 Women's EuroHockey Championship III.

Tournament record

EuroHockey Championship II
2019 – 8th place

EuroHockey Championship III
2005 – 8th place
2007 – 6th place
2011 – 4th place
2013 – 4th place
2015 – 
2017 – 
2021 –

Hockey World League
2012–13 – Round 1
2014–15 – 37th place
2016–17 – 31st place

FIH Hockey Series
2018–19 – First round

See also
 Turkey men's national field hockey team

References

European women's national field hockey teams
national team
Field hockey